Ana Lucía Domínguez Tobón (born December 2, 1983) is a Colombian actress and model.

Biography 
Ana Lucía Domínguez Tobón was born on December 2, 1983 in Bogotá, Colombia. In her home country, she studied acting, speech, and body language.

Career 
As a child, she dreamed of being a part of the acting world. She saw Margarita Rosa de Francisco playing the part of Gaviota in "Cafe con aroma de mujer" (Coffee with the smell of a woman) and she wanted to be like her, a multitalented artist who, in addition to acting, also sings and performed as an announcer on television. She began recording commercials for television at nine years of age. Her first television appearance was on the soap opera "Padres e hijos" (Fathers and sons). Much later, she performed in "De pies a cabeza" (From feet to head) and "Conjunto Cerrado" (Closed Set). "Hermosa Niña" (Beautiful Girl) was the first series in which she played the leading role. It was at this stage of her life that she decided to focus on acting.

Later, she achieved success as the presenter in "Los angeles de la Mega" (The Angels of the Mega). Her international debut in telenovelas (soap operas) was in "Gata Salvaje" (Wild cat), but it was after her part in the telenovela "Pasion de Gavilanes" (Passion of the Sparrowhawks) that she became internationally established. Her fame grew throughout all of Latin America and Spain, even appearing in the nude on the cover of the well known magazine "Interviu" (Interview), and the Colombian magazine SoHo on two occasions. 

In 2009, she was hired by Telemundo to star in the soap opera Perro Amor (Puppy Love), along with Puerto Rican actor Carlos Ponce and Colombian actress Maritza Rodríguez, for which she moved to Miami; in this same production she was given the opportunity to sing a pair of songs. In the same year, she participated in the Colombian series "El Fantasma del Gran Hotel" [The Ghost of the Great Hotel]. She played the role of Martina in the soap opera "La Traicionera" (The Treacherous One) on the RCN channel, together with her husband Jorge Cardenas.

Personal life 
In 2001 she got married at the age of 18 to the comedian David Alberto García, who was 14 years older than her, after five years of courtship. The couple divorced two years later.

In 2008, the actress announced her wedding with the Colombian singer and actor, Jorge Cárdenas.

Filmography

Television

Awards and nominations

Premios India Catalina

Premios TV y Novelas

Premio Mara de Oro Venezuela

References

External links

 Ana Luciá Domínguez on Colarte
 Her page on Univision
 Her page on Modelos colombianas

1983 births
Living people
Colombian telenovela actresses
Colombian female models